The military of the Han dynasty was the military apparatus of China from 202 BC to 220 AD, with a brief interregnum by the reign of Wang Mang and his Xin dynasty from 9 AD to 23 AD, followed by two years of civil war before the refounding of the Han.

Organization

Recruitment and training

At the start of the Han dynasty, male commoners were liable for conscription starting from the age of 23 until the age of 56. The minimum age was lowered to 20 after 155 BC, briefly raised to 23 again during the reign of Emperor Zhao of Han (r. 87–74 BC), but returned to 20 afterwards. Some convicts could choose to commute their service by serving on the frontier. Conscripts trained for one year and then served for another year either on the frontier, in one of the provinces, or at the capital as guards. A relatively small minority of these conscripts would also have served in the cavalry division in the north, which was primarily composed of volunteers from families of superior status, or water borne forces in the south. Conscripts were generally trained to arrange themselves in a formation five men deep, but actual practice on the battlefield could be flexible with some commanders preferring ranks of up to 10 men deep. Implementation of daily best practices was also highly dependent on each individual commander, with some like Li Guang eschewing administrative details while Cheng Buzhi always kept his men in tight formations. After finishing their two years of service, the conscripts were discharged. During Western Han times discharged conscripts could still be called up for training once a year but this practice was discontinued after 30 AD.

Certain nobles were exempt from military conscription. Those of ranks four to eight did not have to perform service in their locality and those of rank 9 and higher had full exemptions. During the Eastern Han period, commoners were allowed to commute military service by paying a scutage tax.

Professional and Semi-Professional Armies

Garrison troops and armies in the provinces and frontiers were often professional or semi-professional military colonists. These soldiers were stationed on the frontier and served in the military in return for a land allotment. This land was often in the frontier itself, and created a self sustaining system where the soldiers and retired soldiers would be able to farm land that would produce the food that would feed their armies and local populace. The difference between military colonies and agricultural colonies was that the former provided regular military service as well as grain, whereas the latter only provided grain and/or taxes.

During the time of Emperor Wu of Han, people of low reputation and/or low economic class who were initially conscripted often stayed in the military as a way to advance their social and economic status. This created another class of professional or semi-professional troops that numbered at least 150,000 soldiers by 97 BC:

The Northern Army was the formal professional force of full-time soldiers which had existed since 180 BC. It originally consisted of eight regiments and around 8,000 troops, but was later reorganized from 31 to 39 AD into a smaller force of five regiments, around 4,200 troops. The five regiments were each commanded by a colonel: the colonel of garrison cavalry, the colonel of picked cavalry, the colonel of infantry, the colonel of Chang River, and the colonel of archers. A captain of the center inspected the Northern Army and their encampments.

There was also a Southern Army, created in 138 BC, with a total force of 6,000 troops. However the soldiers rotated in and out every year so they are not considered a "standing" professional force

In 188 AD an "Army of the Western Garden" was created from the private troops of a collection of warlords as a counterweight to the Northern Army.

According to Rafe de Crespigny, the total number of [formal] professional soldiers in the Eastern Han, including all the smaller groups, amounted to some 20,000 soldiers.

Officers
Neither the Qin or Han armies had permanent generals or field commanders. They were chosen from court officials on an ad hoc basis and appointed directly by the emperor as the need arose. At times several generals were given control of expeditionary forces to prevent any one general from obtaining overwhelming power and rebelling. A general's stipends were equivalent or slightly below that of the Nine Ministers, but in the case of failure on campaign, a general could face very severe penalties such as execution. Smaller forces were led a colonel (xiaowei)

Logistics
According to Zhao Chongguo who served in the first century BC, a force of 10,281 men required 27,363 hu of grain and 308 hu of salt each month, requiring a convoy of 1,500 carts for transport. One hu is 19.968 liters, meaning that each soldier required per month 51.9 liters of grain and 0.6 liters of salt. Another document at Juyan suggests 3.2 hu, or 63.8 liters, of grain.

Decline
When imperial authority collapsed after 189 AD, military governors reverted to relying upon their personal retainers as troops. Due to the ensuing chaos of the Three Kingdoms period, there was no need for conscription since displaced peoples voluntarily enlisted in the army for security reasons. The end of the Han system of recruitment eventually led to the rise of a hereditary military class by the beginning of the Jin dynasty (266–420).

Chariots and horses

Although the chariot started losing prominence around the late Warring States period, it remained in use into the Han era until the Xiongnu war of 133 BC when they proved too slow to catch up to an all cavalry force. However chariots were still used as defensive pieces several decades later.

The Han's cavalry forces were fairly limited at the beginning of the dynasty. Their only large scale horse breeding programs existed in cities along northwest China: Tianshui, Longxi, Anding, Beidi, Shang, and Xihe. Emperor Wen of Han (r. 180–157 BC) decreed that three men of age could be exempted from military service for each horse sent by the family to the government. Emperor Jing of Han (r. 157–141 BC) set up 36 government pastures in the northwest to breed horses for military use and sent 30,000 slaves to care for them. By the time Emperor Wu of Han (r. 9 March 141 BC – 29 March 87 BC) came to power, the Han government had control over herds of roughly 300,000 horses, which increased to over 450,000 under Emperor Wu's reign. On paper, the Han dynasty at its height was capable of fielding up to 300,000 horsemen, but was probably constrained by their immense upkeep. A cavalryman on average cost 87,000 cash, not including rations, while a regular soldier only 10,000 cash. The total expenditure of a 300,000 strong cavalry force would therefore have been around 2.18 times the entire government's annual revenue.

Single mounting stirrups were used, but full double stirrups didn't appear until the later Jin dynasty (266–420).

Armour
Han armour was similar to the armour used by the Qin dynasty with some variations and improvements. Soldiers wore suits of lacquered rawhide, hardened leather, bronze, iron, or steel, and came in varieties such as scale and lamellar. Helmets came as rawhide or hardened leather caps that were sometimes supplemented by a layer of metal lamellar, or made of metals such as iron or steel. Some riders wore armour and carried shields and some horses were at least partially armored, but substantial cataphract-like armor with comprehensive armor covering the entire horse is not attested to in writing until the late 2nd century.

During the late 2nd century BC, the government created a monopoly on the ironworks, which may have caused a decrease in the quantity and quality of iron and armour. Bu Shi claimed that the resulting products were inferior because they were made to meet quotas rather than for practical use. These monopolies as debated in the Discourses on Salt and Iron were abolished by the beginning of the 1st century AD. In 150 AD, Cui Shi made similar complaints about the issue of quality control in government production due to corruption: "...not long thereafter the overseers stopped being attentive, and the wrong men have been promoted by Imperial decree. Greedy officers fight over the materials, and shifty craftsmen cheat them... Iron [i.e. steel] is quenched in vinegar, making it brittle and easy to... [?] The suits of armour are too small and do not fit properly."

Composite bows were considered effective against unarmoured enemies at 165 yards, and against armoured opponents at 65 yards.

References to "great shields" mention they were used on the front line to protect spearmen and crossbowmen. Shields were also commonly paired with the single edged dao and used among cavalrymen.

Swords and polearms

The jian was mentioned as one of the "Five Weapons" during the Han dynasty, the other four being dao, spear, halberd, and staff. Another version of the Five Weapons lists the bow and crossbow as one weapon, the jian and dao as one weapon, in addition to halberd, shield, and armour.

The jian was a popular weapon during the Han era and there emerged a class of swordsmen who made their living through fencing. Sword fencing was also a popular pastime for aristocrats. A 37 chapter manual known as the Way of the Jian is known to have existed, but is no longer extant. South and central China were said to have produced the best swordsmen.

There existed a weapon called the "Horse Beheading Jian", so called because it was supposedly able to cut off a horse's head. However, another source says that it was an execution tool used on special occasions rather than a military weapon.

Daos with ring pommels also became widespread as a cavalry weapon during the Han era. The dao had the advantage of being single edged, which meant the dull side could be thickened to strengthen the sword, making it less prone to breaking. When paired with a shield, the dao made for a practical replacement for the jian, hence it became the more popular choice as time went on. After the Han, sword dances using the dao rather than the jian are mentioned to have occurred. Archaeological samples range from 86 to 114 cm in length.

An account of Duan Jiong's tactical formation in 167 AD specifies that he arranged "…three ranks of halberds (長鏃 changzu), swordsmen (利刃 liren) and spearmen (長矛 changmao), supported by crossbows (強弩 qiangnu), with light cavalry (輕騎 jingji) on each wing."

Crossbow

It's clear from surviving inventory lists in Gansu and Xinjiang that the crossbow was greatly favored by the Han dynasty. For example, in one batch of slips there are only two mentions of bows, but thirty mentions of crossbows. Crossbows were mass-produced using material such as mulberry wood and brass; a crossbow in 1068 could pierce a tree at 140 paces. Crossbows were used in numbers as large as 50,000 starting from the Qin dynasty and upwards of several hundred thousand during the Han. According to one authority the crossbow had become "nothing less than the standard weapon of the Han armies" by the second century BC. Han era carved stone images and paintings also contain images of horsemen wielding crossbows. Han soldiers were required to pull an "entry level" crossbow with a draw-weight of 76 kg/168lb to qualify as an entry level  crossbowman, while it was claimed that a few elite troops were capable of bending crossbows by the hands-and-feet method, with a draw-weight in excess of 340 kg/750lb.

The Huainanzi advises its readers not to use crossbows in marshland where the surface is soft and it is hard to arm the crossbow with the foot. The Records of the Grand Historian, completed in 94 BC, mentions that Sun Bin defeated Pang Juan by ambushing him with a body of crossbowmen at the Battle of Maling. The Book of Han, finished 111 AD, lists two military treatises on crossbows.

In the 2nd century AD, Chen Yin gave advice on shooting with a crossbow in the Wuyue Chunqiu:

The crossbow was particularly effective against cavalry charges for two reasons. One, the crossbow could shoot further and harder than the bows of the Xiongnu, and two, even if the enemy went back to collect the quarrels, they had no way of using them because they were too short for their bows.

In 169 BC, Chao Cuo observed that by using the crossbow, it was possible to overcome the Xiongnu:

Special crossbows

In 99 BC, mounted multiple bolt crossbows were used as field artillery against attacking nomadic cavalry.

In 180 AD, Yang Xuan used a type of repeating crossbow powered by the movement of wheels:

The invention of the repeating crossbow has often been attributed to Zhuge Liang, but he in fact had nothing to do with it. This misconception is based on a record attributing improvements to the multiple bolt crossbows to him.

Navy
Beginning in the Han, Chinese warships had changed from clinker built (overlapping planks) to carvel built (side-by-side planks) construction, and multiple layers of superstructure were added. Anchors, rudders, sweeps and sails had become standard for warships. The navy was officially known as the “Tower ship navy" due to the importance of this type of warship in naval strategy. The navy was deployed to defend and then incorporate the Dong'ou state in 138 BC, followed by the 100,000 men-strong conquest of the Nanyue state in 112 BC, and then the suppression of the Minyue state rebellion in 110 BC.

The navy consisted primarily of two classes of ships: the deck ship (艦) and the spear ship (蒙衝). Deck ships resembled a cage with thick planking above deck, on deck and all around the hull as protection against projectiles. The spear ships were long and narrow, designed for ramming enemy ships. 200,000 seamen served in the deck ship fleet, divided into 3 squadrons, the Jianghuai Squadron in Yuchang (now Nanchang), the Kuaiji Squadron in Gouzhang (now near Ningbo) and the Qingqi Squadron in Shandong.

Major campaigns and battles
 Chu–Han Contention

Subduing the kings

After defeating Xiang Yu in 202 BC, Emperor Gaozu of Han's generals were made kings of their own semi-independent realms. Han Xin became King of Chu, Ying Bu King of Huainan, Peng Yue King of Liang, Xin King of Han, Wu Rui King of Changsha, Zang Tu King of Yan, Zhang Ao King of Zhao, Zou Wuzhu King of Minyue, and Zou Yao King of Dong'ou. Only Gong Wei and Zhao Tuo continued to resist at Linjiang and Panyu. Gong Wei was besieged by Liu Jia and Lu Wan for several months until he surrendered. Zhao Tuo, the founder of Nanyue, was too far away and thus ignored for the time being.

In the summer, Zang Tu, the King of Yan, marched on Dai to annex the region. Gaozu immediately led an army against him. His general Zhou Bo defeated the Yan forces and Zang Tu was captured. Lu Wan became the new King of Yan while Fan Kuai was sent to occupy Dai.

Li Ji, an ex-general of Xiang Yu, also revolted but failed to make any headway against Han forces and was forced to flee.

In 201 BC, courtiers accused Han Xin of plotting treason. They urged Gaozu to pre-emptively attack Han Xin. However Han Xin was brought in under the pretext of attending a meeting and demoted to Marquis of Huaiyin. The Kingdom of Chu was divided into two realms ruled by Liu Jia and Liu Jiao. Gaozu also made his son Liu Fei the King of Qi. Han Xin was eventually transferred to the northern frontier to defend it against the Xiongnu.

In 200 BC, Xin, King of Han, surrendered to the Xiongnu at Mayi, Shuofang, Dai Commandery, and joined them in raiding Han territory. Gaozu led an army against them and scattered their forces, defeating them several times before they retreated. Later Xin set up Zhao Li as King of Zhao and marched south against Gaozu. They too were defeated. Seeing the influence the Xiongnu had on his vassals, Gaozu marched north with a large army to confront them. However his men suffered from inadequate clothing to ward off the cold and a lack of supplies, so Gaozu left them behind and advanced to Pingcheng with a smaller party. Modu Chanyu saw his chance to turn the tide and immediately surrounded the city, cutting the emperor off from the rest of his army. It's not clear why, but the Chanyu eventually withdrew some of his men. Sima Qian suggests his consort persuaded him to let the emperor escape. However a prolonged siege would have been impractical anyway since Xin's infantry never made it on time. Seeing the Chanyu's thinned lines, Gaozu sortied out and broke the siege. When Han reinforcements arrived, the Xiongnu withdrew. This came to be known as the Battle of Baideng. Gaozu's narrow escape from capture by the Xiongnu convinced him to make peace with his nomadic enemy. He sent one of his daughters to the Chanyu and offered him silk, wine, and food stuffs. The Chanyu accepted the offer and restricted himself to minor raids throughout the duration of Gaozu's reign.

In 198 BC, Wang Huang of Zhao and Chen Xi of Dai rebelled. Gaozu ordered Peng Yue, King of Liang, to join him in battle against the rebel forces, but he refused.

In 197 BC, Gaozu eliminated the Zhao and Dai rebels. Gaozu's son Liu Heng became the new King of Dai. Peng Yue feared that Gaozu would come for him for his refusal to aid the empire against the rebels, so he began preparations to rebel. When Gaozu received wind of this, he had Peng Yue arrested and executed. In the summer, Ying Bu, the King of Huainan, rebelled and seized the lands of Liu Jia, King of Jing. The King of Chu, Liu Jiao, fled his territory. Gaozu confronted him in battle and defeated Ying Bu's forces. Ying Bu fled but was defeated again and slain, however Gaozu was wounded in battle by an arrow. Gaozu's son, Liu Chang, became the new King of Huainan.

In 196 BC, Han Xin was arrested and executed despite some reservations from Gaozu, who still considered him to be the finest soldier of his era. Xin was finally killed when he was cornered at the town of Canhe by Han general Chai Wu.

In 195 BC, Han general Zhou Bo captured Chen Xi, who revealed that Lu Wan, King of Yan, had supported him in his rebellion. Zhou Bo stormed the Yan capital of Ji, forcing Lu Wan to seek refuge with the Xiongnu. One of Lu Wan's generals, Wei Man, fled east and usurped the throne of Gojoseon in Korea, beginning the era of Wiman Joseon. Meanwhile, Gaozu succumbed to the wound he received in battle against Ying Bu, and died on 28 February, 195 BC. He was succeeded by his 15-year-old son Liu Ying, posthumously Emperor Hui of Han.

In 185 BC, the Han outlawed trade of iron with Nanyue, depriving them of the means to make weapons. In retaliation, Zhao Tuo proclaimed himself emperor and attacked Wu Rui, King of Changsha, taking a number of border towns.

In 181 BC, a Han army marched south against Nanyue. However the hot climate and diseases of the region prevented them from advancing any further into mountains of Nanyue (in modern Guangdong and Guangxi).

On Empress Lü's death in 180 BC, the Lü clan usurped the authority of the chief ministers. Liu Xiang, King of Qi, raised the banner of rebellion and called on the Liu clan to unite against the Lü. Zhou Bo overthrew the Lü clan and made Liu Heng, King of Dai, the new emperor, posthumously known as Emperor Wen of Han. Under the reign of Emperor Wen, the Han made peace with Nanyue and withdrew their army from the border. In return, Zhao Tuo announced that he only used the title of emperor in order to overawe the various kings of the south such as the Xiou (Western Ou), Minyue, and Luoluo. He received nominal vassalage from the Han court and the iron trade was resumed between the two states. 

In 179 BC, Modu Chanyu crossed the Yellow River and raided Yunzhong Commandery. An army of loyal tribes 85,000 led by Guan Ying managed to repel the Xiongnu invaders and forced them to withdraw.

In 178 BC, Liu Xingju, King of Jibei, rebelled. Han general Chen Wu crushed the rebel army, after which Liu Xingju committed suicide. Meanwhile, the Xiongnu overran the Yuezhi in Gansu and the Tarim Basin.

In 166 BC, Xiongnu forces under Laoshang raided within sight of Chang'an and carried off a large number of people and animals.

In 165 BC, the Xiongnu returned and raided within sight of Chang'an again.

In 164 BC, the Xiongnu under Laoshang overran Gansu and the Tarim Basin completely, driving out the Yuezhi and Sakas, who invaded Bactria and occupied Sogdia. The Yuezhi would be pushed out by the Wusun, forcing them further into Sogdia and driving out the Sakas. The Sakas went to Parthia and some to India. A group known as the Lesser Yuezhi fled into southern Gansu and merged with the Qiang population. Laoshang also defeated a group of people in northern Bactria known as the Hathal and turned their chief's skull into a drinking cup. From this western position the Xiongnu conducted yearly raids on the Han.

In 155 BC, Chao Cuo convinced Emperor Jing of Han to take territory from the kingdoms of Chu, Zhao, and Jiaoxi.

In 154 BC, the Rebellion of the Seven States erupted. Liu Pi, King of Wu, was ordered to surrender two provinces. He immediately rebelled with the support of Liu Wu King of Chu, Liu Sui King of Zhao, and the Qi kings of Jiaoxi, Jiaodong, Zichuan, and Ji'nan. The court tried to appease them at first by executing Chao Cuo, however this did not mollify them, and they continued their march west. Opposing them were the emperor's brother Liu Wu King of Liang, and Liu Zhi King of Jibei. The rebel forces captured Jibei and moved south to besiege Suiyang, however they were met by a strong line of fortified towns which they failed to take, halting their advance. Han forces under Zhou Yafu retaliated by seizing Changyi, cutting off the rebel supply route, and advanced to Xiayi before digging in and refusing to do battle. He did however send light cavalry to raid the rebel lines. Without cavalry of their own, they could do nothing to stop him. Soon the rebel army was starving and in desperation they decided to storm Changyi, even managing to penetrate the town for a short while before they were repulsed. They tried a diversionary tactic, attacking one corner of the city with a small force while their main army assaulted the other side. Zhou Yafu anticipated this and concentrated his forces toward repulsing the main rebel assault. Having failed to defeat Zhou Yafu, the rebel army lifted the siege of Suiyang and marched south, only to be overtaken by Zhou and defeated. Liu Wu, King of Chu, committed suicide. Liu Pi escaped further south to Dong'ou (Eastern Ou) with only a few thousand men and was killed by the natives a few months later. The kings of Zhao and the four minor Qi kingdoms all committed suicide one by one as the Han army reached their capitals.

In 139 BC, Minyue invaded Dong'ou, which appealed to the Han for help. An imperial army under Zhuang Zhu came to its aid and forced Zou Wuzhu of Minyue to withdraw south. However the people of Dong'ou were resettled north of the Changjiang and their territory was annexed by Minyue anyway.

In 137 BC, Minyue invaded Nanyue. An imperial army was sent against them, but the Minyue king's brother Zou Yushan usurped the throne and sued for peace, disbanding the army.

Defeating the Xiongnu

In the summer of 133 BC, the Xiongnu Chanyu Junchen led a force of 100,000 to attack Mayi in Shuofang, Dai Commandery. Wang Hui and two other generals attempted to ambush them at Mayi with a large force of 300,000, but Junchen retreated after learning about the ambush from a captured local warden. Wang Hui decided not to give chase and was sentenced to death. He committed suicide. The Han army abandoned chariots after this point.

In the spring of 129 BC, Wei Qing and three other generals led a cavalry force of 40,000 in an attack on the Xiongnu at the frontier markets of Shanggu. Wei Qing successfully killed several thousand Xiongnu and took 700 prisoners. General Gongsun Ao was defeated and lost 7,000 men. He was reduced to commoner status. Li Guang was defeated and captured but managed to escape by feigning death and returned to base. He was reduced to commoner status. Gongsun He failed to find the Xiongnu. That winter the Xiongnu attacked Yuyang in You Province in retaliation.

In the autumn of 128 BC, Wei Qing and Li Xi led a force of 40,000 and defeated the Xiongnu north of Yanmen Commandery.

In the spring of 127 BC, the Xiongnu raided Liaoxi and Yanmen Commandery. Han Anguo tried to stop them with 700 men but failed and retreated to Yuyang. When Wei Qing and two other generals arrived, the Xiongnu fled. Wei Qing pushed forward and successfully evicted the Xiongnu south of the Yellow River, killed 2,300 Xiongnu at Gaoque (Shuofang), and captured 3,075 Xiongnu and one million livestock at Fuli (Wuyuan).

In 126 BC, the Xiongnu led a force of 90,000 under the Wise King (Tuqi) of the Right to attack Dai Commandery, killing its grand administrator Gong You. They also raided Dingxiang and Shang, taking several thousand captives.

In the spring of 124 BC, Wei Qing and four other generals led a force of 100,000, mostly light cavalry, against the Xiongnu. The Wise King (Tuqi) of the Right assumed they would turn back after he retreated, but they did not, and he was surprised at his camp. The Han emerged victorious, capturing ten petty chieftains, 15,000 Xiongnu, and one million livestock.

In the spring of 123 BC, Wei Qing and others led 100,000 cavalry against the Xiongnu, killing and capturing 3,000 north of Dingxiang. However Su Jian and Zhao Xin advanced too far with only 3,000 and were cut down. Zhao Xin defected while Su Jian managed to escape.

In 122 BC, a Xiongnu force of 10,000 raided Shanggu.

In the spring of 121 BC, Huo Qubing led a force of 10,000 cavalry and killed 8,960 Xiongnu west of the Yanzhi Mountains (in modern Gansu). In the summer he and several others marched west. Huo made it as far as the Qilian Mountains south of Jiuquan, killing and capturing 33,000 Xiongnu. The Xiongnu also invaded Yanmen Commandery so Li Guang and Zhang Qian gave chase. Li Guang was suddenly surrounded by 40,000 Xiongnu under the Wise King (Tuqi) of the Left but was able to hold off repeated attacks for two days until Zhang Qian arrived and the Xiongnu retreated. Zhang Qian was demoted to commoner status for arriving late.

In 120 BC, the Xiongnu raided Youbeiping and Dingxiang, carrying off 1,000 captives.

In the summer of 119 BC, Wei Qing and Huo Qubing led a large force of 100,000 cavalry, 200,000 infantry, and 140,000 supply horses against the Xiongnu. When the Han forces arrived, they found the Xiongnu already prepared and waiting. Wei ensconced himself into a fortified ring of chariots and sent out 5,000 cavalry to probe the enemy. The Xiongnu chanyu Yizhixie responded with 10,000 cavalry. The two sides skirmished until evening when a strong wind arose, at which point Wei committed most of his cavalry and encircled the Xiongnu. Yizhixie attempted to break out of the encirclement but lost control of his men and routed. Huo's forces advanced by another route and defeated the Wise King (Tuqi) of the Left. Li Guang failed to rendezvous on time and committed suicide. A hundred thousand horses were lost during the campaign leading up to the Battle of Mobei, crippling Han cavalry forces for some time.

Conquering south, east, and west

In 116 BC, the Xiongnu raided Liang Province.

In 113 BC, chief minister Lü Jia of Nanyue prevented its king Zhao Xing from visiting the Han court. Han Qianqiu was sent to kill Lü Jia. He advanced into Nanyue with only 2,000 men, capturing several towns, until his local allies turned on him, slaying him and his men.

In 112 BC, the Han invaded eastern Tibet with 25,000 cavalry on grounds of Qiang raiding.

In the autumn of 111 BC, Gongsun He and Zhao Ponu led 25,000 cavalry against the Xiongnu, but failed to engage them. Lu Bode and Yang Pu led a force of 35,000 against Nanyue.

In 110 BC, Han forces defeated Nanyue and annexed the region. The king of Minyue, Zou Yushan, thought he would be attacked as well, and pre-emptively attacked Han garrisons. In the winter the Han sent another force and defeated Minyue. The area was abandoned however until further colonization in 200 AD. Emperor Wu of Han assembled his forced in Shuofang and challenged Wuwei Chanyu to meet him in battle. Wuwei declined.

In 109 BC, the Han sent a force of 5,000 under Guo Chang and Wei Guang to Yelang and Dian Kingdom, forcing them to submit to the Han. A Yue rebellion led by Wu Yang resulted in the removal of all the people in Minyue further north. A Han envoy returning from Gojoseon slew his escort and claimed to have slain a general. Gojoseon retaliated by invading Liaodong.

In 108 BC, a Han army of 57,000 under Xun Zhi and Yang Pu invaded Gojoseon. Xun Zhi advanced too far and was defeated. Yang Pu made it to Wanggeom-seong and was defeated. In spring they regrouped and laid siege to Wanggeom-seong. Xun Zhi got into a fight with Yang Pu and had him arrested, combining both their forces under one general. Eventually the people of the city killed their king, Ugeo of Gojoseon, and surrendered. Zhao Ponu sallied out with 25,000 cavalry against the Xiongnu but could not find them. He then attacked Loulan Kingdom and Jushi Kingdom with only 700 cavalry, subjugating them.

In the autumn of 104 BC, Li Guangli led a force of 20,000 convicted conscripts and 6,000 cavalry against Dayuan. The oasis states refused to provide food so they had to attack them to procure necessities. Han deserters who surrendered to Dayuan taught them how to cast metal into coins and weapons.

In the summer of 103 BC, Zhao Ponu attacked the Xiongnu with 20,000 cavalry, but was surrounded and captured. Li Guangli reached Yucheng (Uzgen) but could not take the city and returned to Dunhuang.

In the autumn of 102 BC, Li Guangli led a much larger army of 60,000 men, 100,000 oxen, 30,000 horses, and 20,000 supply animals against Dayuan. The oasis states surrendered and provided food upon seeing the overwhelming force. The only state which resisted was Luntai, so the entire populace was massacred. The army bypassed Yucheng (Uzgen) and headed straight for Dayuan's capital Ershi (Khujand). There the Han crossbowmen easily defeated Dayuan's army and laid siege to the city. After 40 days and diverting the river from the city, removing their water supply, the inhabitants killed their king and provided the Han army 3,000 horses. A scout force under Wang Shencheng was defeated at Yucheng (Uzgen), so Li sent a detachment under Shangguan Jie to storm Yucheng, whose king fled to Kangju. Yucheng then surrendered. Li returned with only 10,000 men.

In 101 BC, the Xiongnu raided Dingxiang, Yunzhong, Zhangye, and Jiuquan.

In the summer of 99 BC, Li Guangli and three other generals led a force of 35,000 against the Xiongnu in the Tian Shan range. Initially successful, Li Guangli killed some 10,000 Xiongnu, but was surrounded and had to fortify. They sortied out and managed to drive back the Xiongnu before making a run for it. The Xiongnu gave chase and dealt heavy casualties on the Han army. Li Guangli only returned with 40% of his forces. Li Ling and Lu Bode had been left further back earlier as a rear guard, but Lu Bode objected to serving under Li Ling and left. Li Ling decided to advance by himself with only 5,000 infantry, confident that his force of crossbowmen would be able to handle any force they encountered. He was confronted with a force of 30,000 Xiongnu and had to fortify behind a wagon laager between two hills. The Xiongnu made repeated charges on his position, but failed to overcome Li Ling's crossbow and shield/spear formation, suffering heavy casualties. When Li Ling's forces made a break for it, the Xiongnu chased after them, harassing them until nightfall. Only 400 men made it back and Li Ling was himself captured.

In the spring of 97 BC, Li Guangli and two other generals led a force of over 160,000 against the Xiongnu. Li's forces were supposedly routed by only 10,000 Xiongnu and fought a running battle for ten days. Gongsun Ao fought an inconclusive battle with the Wise King (Dugi) of the Left. Han Yue failed to encounter any Xiongnu.

In the summer of 94 BC, Xu Xiangru led a force of auxiliaries from the Western Regions against Suoju (Yarkant County) and killed their king, capturing 1,500 people.

In the spring of 90 BC, Li Guangli and two other generals led a force of 79,000 against the Xiongnu. Initially successful, Li overextended and his supplies ran out, exhausting his men and horses. The Xiongnu outpaced them and dug ditches across their line of retreat. When they tried to cross the ditches, the Xiongnu fell on them, routing the entire army. Li Guangli surrendered. The other generals Shang Qiucheng and Ma Tong managed to return safely. Cheng Wan attacked Jushi Kingdom with a force of 35,000 and secured their king's surrender.

In 87 BC, Wen Zhong subjugated a city near modern Islamabad.

In 83 BC, Han relinquished control over Lintun Commandery and Zhenfan Commandery.

In 78 BC, Fan Mingyou led 20,000 soldiers to aid the Wuhuan against the Xiongnu, but they arrived too late, and attacked the Wuhuan instead.

In 75 BC, Goguryeo took some territory from Xuantu Commandery.

In 71 BC, Chang Hui and two other generals led a force of 100,000 to aid the Wusun against the Xiongnu. The majority of the forces failed to find any Xiongnu, but Chang Hui successfully aided the Wusun in defeating a Xiongnu invasion. However the Xiongnu came back in winter and took many captives. On the way back across the Altai Mountains, the Xiongnu suffered heavy casualties from a sudden blizzard, devastating their army. The next year the Xiongnu were attacked on all sides by Wusun, Wuhuan, and the Han. One third of all Xiongnu died.

In 68 BC, Chang Hui led 45,000 auxiliaries from the Western Regions against Qiuci, which surrendered. Zheng Ji also subdued the Jushi Kingdom, its king having fled to the Wusun.

In 65 BC, the Qiang revolted in eastern Tibet and Suoju rebelled as well. Feng Fengshi was sent in with 15,000 men and subdued Suoju.

In 64 BC, the Xiongnu raided Jiaohe.

In 61 BC, Zhao Chongguo advanced into eastern Tibet and set up colonies near Qinghai Lake. He also advocated for reduction of cavalry forces to reduce military expenditure.

Western protectorate
 

In 60 BC, Xianxianchan, the Rizhu King of Jushi Kingdom, surrendered to Zheng Ji. The Protectorate of the Western Regions was created and the Han gained hegemony over the western oasis states.

In 58 BC, Woyanqudi Chanyu died and the Xiongnu split up into five warring factions.

In 55 BC, the Xiongnu coalesced into two groups, one under Zhizhi Chanyu and the other under his brother Huhanye.

In 51 BC, Huhanye was defeated by Zhizhi Chanyu and fled to the Han.

In 50 BC, Zhizhi Chanyu nominally submitted to the Han.

In 48 BC, Zhizhi Chanyu declared independence after seeing the Han favor his brother Huhanye. He attacked the Wusun and based his operations in Zungaria.

In 43 BC, Huhanye moved back to the north, starting the era of Western and Eastern Xiongnu.

In 42 BC, the Qiang rebelled and defeated a force of 12,000 under Feng Fengshi.

In 41 BC, Feng Fengshi returned to eastern Tibet with 60,000 men and crushed the Qiang rebellion.

In 36 BC, Gan Yanshou and Chen Tang led a force of 40,000 against the Xiongnu led by Zhizhi Chanyu, who had built a fortress capital in Kangju (around modern Taraz). Gan Yanshou, Imperial Han Protector of the Western Regions, did not care about Zhizhi, but his subordinate commander, Chen Tang, forged an imperial edict to mobilize some 40,000 troops against the Chanyu. They reached Wusun territory and then advanced on Kangju. Several thousand Kangju attacked them as they were settling in and took their supplies. When the Kangju attacked again, the Han army was ready, driving them off with crossbows, killing 400 Kangju soldiers, and recovering their supplies. Some 400 Wusun slaves, a large contingent of Sogdians, and Kangju nobles sick of the Xiongnu joined the Han army. Upon reaching Zhizhi's fortress, the army started constructing a fortified camp, but the Xiongnu sallied out with several hundred armoured cavalry and a supporting infantry force in a formation that looked like fish scales. The Xiongnu forces were defeated by Han crossbowmen and fled back into the fort. That night the Xiongnu tried to escape and in the process lost many men to the besieging crossbowmen. The next day, the Han forces tried to take the fortress by a frontal attack under cover of shields and crossbowmen but failed to burn the gate and were forced retreated. Chen then decided to fully encircle the city with a walled palisade. Xiongnu defenders throwing incendiaries and shooting arrows on the fortress walls were swept away by crossbowmen who rained bolts on them until they fled. Zhizhi and the Xiongnu tried to flee again in the night but were intercepted by Sogdian soldiers who alerted the Han army. Zhizhi was forced to turn back and re-enter the fortress. In the morning, Chinese archers shot incendiary arrows into the fort and started large fires. Zhizhi retreated into the inner citadel. A Kangju relief force made several attacks on the Han position at night, delaying the inevitable assault and allowing the defenders to repair their walls. However they failed to prevent the Han army from building a rampart to the top of the walls. When the Han army attacked, the city fell with ease and Zhizhi Chanyu was stabbed to death. His children and concubines were among 1,518 people executed. More than 1,000 were made slaves and 145 men were taken as prisoners. During this battle, an infantry unit on the Kangju side used a formation described as having the appearance of fish scales, which has caused speculation that they were Roman legionnaires captured at Carrhae. Evidence is inconclusive.

In 12 BC, Duan Huizong led a force to Wusun and resolved a dispute.

In 6 AD, a petty king in the area of the former Jushi Kingdom defected to the Xiongnu, who turned him over to the Han.

In 7 AD, the Han convinced the Wuhuan to stop sending tribute to the Xiongnu, who immediately attacked and defeated the Wuhuan.

In 9 AD, Wang Mang proclaimed himself emperor of the Xin dynasty.

In 10 AD, some officers of the Protector General Dan Qin rebelled, slew him, and fled to the Xiongnu.

In 11 AD, Wuzhuliu Chanyu of the Xiongnu attacked Yunzhong, Yanmen, and Shuofang commanderies.

In 16 AD, an army under Li Chong and Guo Qin was sent to subdue Yanqi. One contingent was ambushed and defeated but the other massacred the population of Yanqi. Other regions remained loyal along with Suoju.

Eastern Han

In 23 AD, Wang Mang's Xin dynasty was defeated and 12 years of civil war ensued. The Protectorate of the Western Regions was left to its own devices. In the absence of the Han, Xian of Suoju became Hegemon King of the Western Regions and was even able to extend its power over Dayuan to the west. In 50 AD, Suoju attacked Dayuan with an army of 10,000 when their king, Yanliu, failed to send tribute. Yanliu was brought back to Suoju while King Qiaositai of Jumi was sent to rule Dayuan. However Qiaositai suffered from repeated attacks by Kangju and abandoned Dayuan. Yanliu was sent back to Dayuan. In 60 AD, Xiumoba of Yutian rebelled against Xian but died in the assault on Suoju. Xiumoba's nephew Guangde captured Suoju in 61 AD. When the Northern Xiongnu learned of this, they attacked Yutian and enthroned Xian's son, Bujuzheng, as king of Suoju. After Dou Gu defeated the Northern Xiongnu in 73 AD, Guangde joined the Han forces in subjugating Suoju. Guangde's brother, Qili, became the new king of Suoju in 87 AD.

In 35 AD, Emperor Guangwu of Han, also known as the "Bronze Horse Emperor," reunited the Han dynasty.

In 40 AD, Jiuzhen, Jiaozhi, and Rinan commanderies rebelled under the Trung sisters.

In 42 AD, the Trung sisters' rebellion was defeated by Ma Yuan.

In 49 AD, the Qiang tribes retook the Qinghai region

In 50 AD, Bi chanyu and the Southern Xiongnu settled in Bing Province.

In 57 AD, the Qiang led by Dianyu raided Jincheng Commandery.

In 59 AD, a Han army defeated Dianyu.

In 62 AD, the Northern Xiongnu made a major raid but was repelled.

In 69 AD, Liumiao the King of the Ailao, submitted to the Han dynasty. His territory was incorporated under eight new counties, extending Han territory into modern Myanmar.

In 73 AD, Dou Gu led a force of 12,000 against the Xiongnu and defeated Huyan in modern northeastern Xinjiang.

In 74 AD, Dou Gu led another expedition to the Western Regions and gained the submission of Jushi, restoring the Protectorate of the Western Regions.

In 75 AD, the Xiongnu besieged Jushi and Chen Mu was killed by the locals.

In 76 AD, Lei'ao the King of the Ailao, gathered 3,000 men and attacked the headquarters of Yongchang Commandery and drove out Han administration. Nine thousand Han militia and non-Chinese auxiliaries were called up from surrounding commanderies and defeated him in the following year. His head was sent to Luoyang.

In 77 AD, the Protectorate of the Western Regions was abandoned again.

In 78 AD, Ban Chao defeated Gumo, which was aided by Kangju.

In 84 AD, Ban Chao brought forces against Shule, but could not defeat them due to reinforcements from their ally, Kangju. Ban Chao sent gifts to the Kushan Empire and they influenced the Kangju troops to retreat. The king of Suoju went with them.

In 87 AD, Ban Chao attacked Suoju with 25,000 men. They were heavily outnumbered due to 50,000 reinforcements from Suoju's ally, Qiuci, but Ban Chao made a false retreat and deceived the army of Qiuci into giving chase. Ban Chao then rounded back and made a surprise attack on the Suoju camp, defeating them. The army of Qiuci withdrew.

In the summer of 89 AD, Dou Xian led an army of around 45,000 against the Northern Xiongnu and defeated them. This marked the effective end of Xiongnu power in the steppes and the rise of the less organized but more aggressive Xianbei.

In 90 AD, the Protectorate of the Western Regions was restored under Ban Chao. Qiuci, Gumo, and Wensu submitted to the Han. The Kushan Empire sent the general known as Xie with an army of 70,000 against Ban Chao in Shule. Ban Chao fled and implemented a scorched earth policy which left the Kushan army with no supplies. Xie sought to purchase supplies at Qiuci, but Ban Chao anticipated this, and laid an ambush for the Kushan messengers, killing them. Realizing that they could advance no further, Xie retreated.

In 96 AD, Han forces attacked the Xiongnu king Wujuzhan and killed him.

In 107 AD, Dianlian of the Qiang Xianlian attacked Liang Province. As a result, the Protectorate of the Western Regions was abandoned. The Han court sent Deng Zhi and Ren Shang against the invading army, and although the Qiang forces suffered significant casualties, they were defeated at Hanyang Commandery. Having achieved victory against the Han army, Dianlian proclaimed himself emperor at Beidi Commandery. Qiang forces now threatened Han territory as far south as Hanzhong Commandery and as far east as Ji Province.

In 109 AD, Dianlian conquered Longxi Commandery. The Wuhuan and Xianbei attacked Wuyuan Commandery and defeated local Han forces. The Southern Xiongnu chanyu Wanshishizhudi rebelled against the Han and attacked the Emissary Geng Chong but failed to oust him. Han forces under Geng Kui retaliated and defeated a force of 3,000 Xiongnu but could not take the Southern Xiongnu capital due to disease among the horses of their Xianbei allies.

In 110 AD, Dianlian defeated and killed the Administrator Zheng Qin in Hanzhong Commandery. The Southern Xiongnu raided Changshan Commandery and Zhongshan Commandery. The Wanshi Chanyu engaged in battle with a Han army of 8,000 under Liang Qin. The Xiongnu surrounded the Han army, but Liang Qin broke through the encirclement, killing 3,000 and defeating the Xiongnu forces. The Wanshi Chanyu surrendered and was given amnesty.

In 112 AD, Dianlian died and was succeeded by his son Lianchang. Lianchang was too young to exercise authority and another man of the tribe, Langmo, took charge of strategy. The new regime was significantly less effective under the regent and failed to make any headway against Han forces.

In 116 AD, the Han general Deng Zun led 10,000 Southern Xiongnu cavalry in a raid on Lianchang's headquarters from the north. Meanwhile, Ren Shang attacked from the south and killed Lianchang's wife and children. Hill peoples under Chentang and Yangsun led a rebellion in Wuling Commandery but were quickly put down by local tribal auxiliaries.

In 117 AD, Lianchang was assassinated and forces under Ren Shang ended Qiang raids.

In 120 AD, the Qiang chieftain Jiwu attacked Jincheng Commandery and was defeated by the general Ma Xian.

In 121 AD, the Xianbei under Qizhijian raided Han territory. The Qiang Shaodang tribe under Manu raided Wuwei Commandery but were defeated by the general Ma Xian the following year. Go Suseong of Goguryeo attacked Xuantu Commandery but was defeated by a combined Han-Buyeo army.

In 126 AD, Ban Yong invaded the Western Regions and conquered Yanqi. Qiuci, Yutian, and Suoju submitted to Han. The Protectorate of the Western Regions was however not re-established and only a chief clerk was appointed to deal with the western states. The Han attempted to colonize Yiwu several times in the following decades but these efforts were cut short in 157 AD by other disturbances to the far south. Official administration over the Western Regions was not re-established by another Chinese state until the Tang dynasty in the 7th century AD. Qizhijian of the Xianbei attacked Dai Commandery and killed the Administrator Li Chao.

In 127 AD, the Xianbei raided Liaodong Commandery and Xuantu Commandery.

In 128 AD, the Xianbei attacked Yuyang Commandery.

In 136 AD, people known as the Qulian from beyond the southern frontier attacked Rinan Commandery, causing turmoil and confusion.

In 137 AD, a rebellion occurred in Rinan Commandery and was peacefully quelled without resorting to arms.

In 140 AD, the Qiang rebelled. Wusi and Cheniu of the Southern Xiongnu rebelled.

In 141 AD, Wusi and Cheniu were defeated. Cheniu surrendered while Wusi was killed by his followers in 143.

In 142 AD, the Qiang rebellion was put down.

In 144 AD, a rebellion occurred in Rinan Commandery and was peacefully quelled without resorting to arms.

In 145 AD, the Xianbei raided Dai Commandery.

In 157 AD, a rebellion occurred in Jiuzhen Commandery and was defeated.

In 166 AD, the Xianbei started conducting annual raids.

In 167 AD, Duan Jiong conducted an anti-Qiang campaign and massacred Qiang populations as well as settled them outside the frontier.

In 169 AD, Geng Lin attacked Goguryeo forced the king to offer submission.

In 168 AD, the Xianbei under Tanshihuai raided Han territory.

In 177 AD, Xia Yu, Tian Yan and the Tute Chanyu led a force of 30,000 against the Xianbei. They were defeated and returned with only a quarter of their original forces.

In 178 AD, Liang Long rebelled in the south.

In 181 AD, Zhu Juan defeated Liang Long's rebellion.

In 182 AD, the Xianbei khan Tanshihuai died and his weak successor Helian failed to keep the confederacy intact.

In 184 AD, the Yellow Turban Rebellion and Liang Province rebellion erupted, leading to the fragmentation and downfall of the Han dynasty.

Full list of military campaigns

Han–Xiongnu War

Northern and Southern Xiongnu

Southern wars

Korean wars

Western regions

Qiang

Wuhuan

Xianbei

Rebellions
 Rebellion of the Seven States
 Red Eyebrows
 Lulin
 Yellow Turban Rebellion
 Liang Province rebellion

Notable military leaders

Western Han
 Han Xin
 Emperor Gaozu of Han
 Wei Qing
 Li Guangli
 Li Guang
 Huo Qubing
 Gongsun Ao
 Li Ling

Eastern Han
 Ban Chao
 Cao Cao
 Dou Gu
 Dou Xian

References

Bibliography

 

 

Military history of the Han dynasty